Sammy Conn (26 October 1961 – 17 August 2014) was a Scottish professional football player and manager.

Career
Born in Lanark, Conn played as a midfielder for Polkemmet Juniors, Falkirk, Albion Rovers, Clydebank, Airdrie and Cowdenbeath. After being player-manager of Cowdenbeath between 1996 and 1997, Conn later worked as a youth coach at Ayr United before becoming assistant manager of Dalry Thistle.

Conn suffered from motor neurone disease. He died on 17 August 2014 at age 52.

References

1961 births
2014 deaths
Scottish footballers
Falkirk F.C. players
Albion Rovers F.C. players
Clydebank F.C. (1965) players
Airdrieonians F.C. (1878) players
Cowdenbeath F.C. players
Scottish Football League players
Association football midfielders
Scottish football managers
Cowdenbeath F.C. managers
Scottish Football League managers
Deaths from motor neuron disease